Trogotorna is a monotypic moth genus of the family Noctuidae. Its only species, Trogotorna persecta, is found in South America, including Brazil. Both the genus and species were first described by George Hampson in 1910.

Adults are on wing in January, April and December.

References

External links
Specht, Alexandre; Silva, Eduardo J. E. & Link, Dionísio (October–December 2004). "Noctuídeos (Lepidoptera, Noctuidae) Do Museu Entomológico Ceslau Biezanko, Departamento De Fitossanidade, Faculdade De Agronomia “Eliseu Maciel”, Universidade Federal De Pelotas, Rs". Revista Brasileira de Agrociência. 10 (4): 389–409. 

Acontiinae
Monotypic moth genera